Anna Amalia of Brunswick-Wolfenbüttel (24 October 173910 April 1807), was a German princess and composer. She became the duchess of Saxe-Weimar-Eisenach, by marriage, and was also regent of the states of Saxe-Weimar and Saxe-Eisenach from 1758 to 1775. She transformed her court and its surrounding into the most influential cultural center of Germany.

Family 
She was born in Wolfenbüttel, the third child of Karl I, Duke of Brunswick-Wolfenbüttel and Princess Philippine Charlotte of Prussia. Her maternal grandparents were Frederick William I of Prussia and Sophia Dorothea of Hanover.

Education 
Anna Amalia was well-educated as befitted a princess. She studied music with Friedrich Gottlob Fleischer and Ernst Wilhelm Wolf..

Marriage 
In Brunswick, on 16 March 1756, sixteen-year-old Anna Amalia married eighteen-year-old Ernst August II Konstantin, Duke of Saxe-Weimar-Eisenach and they had two sons. Ernst August died in 1758 leaving her regent for their infant son, Karl August.

Regency 
During Karl August's minori ty she administered the affairs of the duchy with notable prudence, strengthening its resources and improving its position in spite of the troubles of the Seven Years' War.Despite her heavy official responsibilities, she cultivated intellectual interests, especially music. She continued to take lessons in composition and keyboard playing from the leading musician in Weimar. Amalia von Helvig, a German-Swedish artist and writer, later became part of her court. She hired Christoph Martin Wieland, a poet and translator of William Shakespeare, to educate her son. [2] . On September 3, 1775, her son reached his majority, and she retired.

Cultural role 
As a patron of the arts, Anna Amalia drew many of the most eminent people in Germany to Weimar. She gathered a group of scholars, poets and musicians, professional and amateur, for lively discussion and music-making at the Wittum palace. In this ‘court of the muses’, as Wilhelm Bode called it, the members included Johann Gottfried Herder, Johann Wolfgang von Goethe, and Friedrich Schiller. She succeeded in engaging Abel Seyler's theatrical company. considered the best theatre company in Germany at that time." 

Anna Amalia herself played a significant part in bringing together the poetry of ‘Weimar Classicism.’ Johann Adam Hiller's most successful Singspiel, Die Jagd (the score of which is dedicated to the duchess), received its first performance in Weimar in 1770, and Weimar was also the scene of the notable première on 28 May 1773 of the ‘first German opera’, Wieland's Alceste in the setting by Anton Schweitzer. Anna Amalia continued the tradition of the Singspiel in later years with performances in the amateur court theatre of her own compositions to texts by Goethe.  

She also established the Duchess Anna Amalia Library, which is now home to some 1,000,000 volumes. The duchess was honored in Goethe's work under the title Zum Andenken der Fürstin Anna-Amalia.

Music 
Anna Amalia was a notable composer. . The majority of her works belong stylistically to the Empfindsamkeit, in the manner of Hiller and Schweitzer, combining features of song and of arioso.

Her compositions include:

Chamber 
Divertimento (clarinet, viola, violoncello, and piano) c. 1780

Harpsichord 
sonatas

Opera 
Das Jahrmarktsfest zu Plundersweilern (text by Goethe)

Erwin und Elmire (text by Goethe) 1776

Orchestra 
Oratorio (1768)

Sacred Choruses (four voices and orchestra)

Symphony (2 oboes, 2 flutes, 2 violins and double bass) 1765

Vocal 
songs

Ancestry

References

Further reading

External links 

 PRNewsWire: Goethe's forbidden love for Anna Amalia
 Death Mask of Ann Amalia Of Brunswick
 
 

|-

|-

1739 births
1807 deaths
People from Wolfenbüttel
House of Brunswick-Bevern
18th-century women rulers
German opera composers
Women opera composers
House of Saxe-Weimar-Eisenach
18th-century German people
Duchesses of Saxe-Weimar
Duchesses of Saxe-Eisenach
German women classical composers
Regents
German female regents
Daughters of monarchs